This is a list of fighter aces in World War II from the Soviet Union.

See also
 :Category:Soviet World War II flying aces
 List of World War II aces by country

References

Bibliography 

Soviet Union
 
Russian and Soviet military-related lists
Lists of Russian and Soviet military personnel